Mario Ochoa may refer to:
Mario Ochoa (footballer) (born 1927), Mexican football midfielder
Mario Ochoa (DJ) (born 1982), DJ and producer